Conditions of My Parole is the second studio album by Puscifer. The album was produced by Maynard James Keenan, Mat Mitchell and Josh Eustis. Contributing musicians for the album include the aforementioned Keenan, Mitchell, and Eustis as well as Carina Round, Juliette Commagere, Matt McJunkins, Jeff Friedl, Gil Sharone and Rani Sharone, Jonny Polonsky, Tim Alexander, Devo Keenan, Alessandro Cortini, Tanya O'Callaghan, Sarah Jones, and Jon Theodore. The video for "Conditions of My Parole" featured Maynard and Laura Milligan from Mr. Show as their characters Billy D. and Hildy Berger, who also appear in character on the album cover.

Critical reception

The album received positive reviews. Gregory Heaney of AllMusic described it as "a fine piece of cold weather headphone music".

Track listing

Personnel
Performers
Maynard James Keenan – lead vocals
Carina Round – additional vocals (1–10, 12), guitar (2)
Mat Mitchell – bass (1, 2, 6, 7, 10) guitar (1, 2, 4, 6, 8, 9, 10), programming (1, 4, 5, 6, 7, 11), banjo (2)
Josh Eustis – programming (1, 3–7, 11), guitar (2, 5, 7, 9, 10, 12), piano (3), banjo (12), erhu (12)
Jonny Polonsky – guitar (1, 3, 6, 7), mandolin (6)
Jon Theodore – drums (2, 7, 9, 10)
Matt McJunkins – bass (3, 4, 9)
Devo Keenan – cello (3)
Jeff Friedl – drums (3), percussion (3), additional percussion (6–8)
Sarah Jones – drums (6, 7) 
Tanya O'Callaghan – bass (7)
Gil Sharone – drums (8)
Rani Sharone – bass (8)
Juliette Commagere – additional vocals (11)
Alessandro Cortini – Buchla (11)
Tim Alexander – drums (12)

Production
Ms. Puscifer – production
Mat Mitchell – production, mixing
Josh Eustis – mixing
Bob Ludwig – mastering
Brian Gardner – mastering
Tim Cadiente – photography
Juan Mendez – graphic design

Charts

References

Puscifer albums
2011 albums
Self-released albums